658 Asteria is a minor planet orbiting the Sun.

References

External links
 
 

Koronis asteroids
Asteria
Asteria
S-type asteroids (Tholen)
19080123